Mike Brooks (March 29, 1955  June 23, 2021) was a television news correspondent for CNN. He appeared regularly on HLN's Nancy Grace show, and Prime News and gave significant coverage of the Anna Nicole Smith paternity controversy, as well as the Virginia Tech massacre. Brooks was also seen on Tru TV's In Session (formerly Court TV), where he provided commentary as their law-enforcement analyst.

Early life 

Michael Joseph Brooks was born on March 29, 1955.  Originally of Arlington, Virginia, Brooks was the son of Clarence Joseph "Joe" Brooks (19271999) and Margaret Mary Brooks.  He graduated from Bishop Denis J. O'Connell High School in Arlington, before joining the DC Metropolitan Police Department in 1973.

Career 

Brooks was also a retired police detective, employed for 26 years by the Washington, D.C., Metropolitan Police Department. He was assigned to the Federal Bureau of Investigation Joint Terrorism Task Force, and also served as an instructor for several public safety courses. His work on the FBI Evidence Response and Rapid Deployment Team included assignments to the Khobar Towers bombing in Saudi Arabia, the United States Embassy bombing in Kenya, and the crash of TWA Flight 800. Brooks left Turner Broadcasting in October 2014.

Personal life 

Brooks was 6'7" tall.

He died on June 23, 2021, at the age of 66.

References

External links 

 Obituary – Michael Joseph Brooks (March 29, 1955 – June 23, 2021)

1955 births
2021 deaths
American police detectives
American television reporters and correspondents
CNN people
Metropolitan Police Department of the District of Columbia officers